Lane Beattie is an American businessman and politician from the state of Utah.

Beattie served in the Utah Senate from 1989 through 2000, representing the 23rd Utah Senate District. He served as Senate Majority Leader from 1993 through 1994 and Senate President from 1995. He opted not to seek reelection in 2000. Beattie helped plan the 2002 Winter Olympics, held in Salt Lake City, and consulted with the committee planning the 2010 Winter Olympics, held in Vancouver, Canada. Beattie is the President and Chief Executive Officer of the Salt Lake Chamber of Commerce, and he was named to the board of directors of the United States Chamber of Commerce in 2011.

Beattie was a potential candidate in the 2016 election for the United States Senate seat held by Mike Lee.

References

External links

Living people
1951 births
People from Davis County, Utah
University of Utah alumni
United States Chamber of Commerce people
Republican Party Utah state senators